Orthomegas is a genus of beetles in the family Cerambycidae, containing the following species:

 Orthomegas cinnamomeus (Linnaeus, 1758)
 Orthomegas folschveilleri Audureau, 2011
 Orthomegas fragosoi (Bleuzen, 1993)
 Orthomegas frischeiseni (Lackerbeck, 1998)
 Orthomegas haxairei (Bleuzen, 1993)
 Orthomegas irroratus (Lameere, 1915)
 Orthomegas jaspideus Buquet in Guérin-Méneville, 1844
 Orthomegas marechali (Bleuzen, 1993)
 Orthomegas maryae (Schmid, 2011)
 Orthomegas monnei (Bleuzen, 1993)
 Orthomegas pehlkei (Lameere, 1904)
 Orthomegas similis (Gahan, 1894)
 Orthomegas sylvainae Audureau, 2011

References

Prioninae